The Black Shield of Falworth is a 1954 American Technicolor film from Universal-International, produced by Robert Arthur and Melville Tucker and directed by Rudolph Maté. It stars Tony Curtis, Janet Leigh, David Farrar, Herbert Marshall, and Torin Thatcher. The screenplay, set in Medieval England, was adapted by Oscar Brodney and is based on Howard Pyle's 1891 novel Men of Iron. The original music score was composed by Hans J. Salter although his name does not appear in the screen credits. The only musical notation is given as: "Music Supervision by Joseph Gershenson". Made Universal's music department head in 1940, Gershenson's name appeared on nearly every film made by that studio from 1949-1969. 

The film was Universal-International's first feature made in CinemaScope. It opened in New York City's Times Square on October 6, 1954 at the Loew's State Theater. It was the second of five feature films in which husband and wife Tony Curtis and Janet Leigh appeared together on screen during their marriage (1952-1961).

Plot
Myles Falworth (Tony Curtis) and his sister Meg (Barbara Rush) live in obscurity on a farm in Crisbey-Dale with their guardian Diccon Bowman (Rhys Williams). This is to protect them from the attainder placed upon their family by King Henry IV of England (Ian Keith) because their father has been (falsely) accused of treason and murdered by the Earl of Alban (David Farrar). When a hunting party comprising the Earl of Alban, the lord of Crisbey-Dale, and another nobleman, Sir Robert, stop at their farm for refreshment, they are repulsed by Myles, who stops them from molesting his sister.

This confrontation accelerates Diccon's plans to send them to Mackworth Castle in Derbyshire (based on the eponymous castle), so that they can come under the protection of William, The Earl of Mackworth (Herbert Marshall), a close friend of Myles and Meg's father. In Myles he sees the man who can finally rid England of the evil machinations of the Earl of Alban. Myles is first trained to be a squire, then as a knight, and is finally knighted by the king. He is successful in killing the Earl of Alban in a trial by combat, foiling Alban's attempt to seize the English crown. Myles, having fallen in love with the Earl of Mackworth's daughter while staying at the castle, is finally able to propose marriage to the Lady Anne (Janet Leigh) after he has proven his mettle. The Earl gives his hearty consent, and the two families are joined.

Cast

False quotation
The film is famous for an apocryphal line, attributed to Tony Curtis and rendered as "Yonda stands da castle of my fodda" or similar. The plot details above show that this would not fit the story: there is no "castle of my father". The line is said to have come from a remark made by Debbie Reynolds on television. Life magazine attributed the line to Curtis while performing in the 1951 film The Prince Who Was a Thief.

References

External links

1954 films
American historical adventure films
1950s historical adventure films
Films based on American novels
Films based on romance novels
Films set in castles
Films set in the 15th century
Films directed by Rudolph Maté
Universal Pictures films
Films set in Derbyshire
Films scored by Hans J. Salter
CinemaScope films
1950s English-language films
1950s American films